Enga Mama is a 1970 Indian Tamil-language film, directed by A. C. Tirulokchandar and produced by P.K.V.Sankaran and Aarumugam. The film stars Sivaji Ganesan, Jayalalithaa and Vennira Aadai Nirmala. It is a remake of the 1968 Hindi film Brahmachari.

Plot

Cast

Soundtrack 
The music was composed by M. S. Viswanathan.

Release 
Enga Mama was released on 14 January 1970. The film was a commercial success, running for over 100 days in theatres.

References

External links 
 

1970 films
1970s Tamil-language films
Films directed by A. C. Tirulokchandar
Films scored by M. S. Viswanathan
Tamil remakes of Hindi films